Anna Yuryevna Kikina (born 27 August 1984) is a Russian engineer and cosmonaut, selected in 2012. She is the only female cosmonaut currently in active service at Roscosmos. In June 2020, fellow cosmonaut Oleg Kononenko said that Kikina was expected to fly on a fall 2022 mission to the International Space Station (ISS) and perform a spacewalk during the mission. In September 2021, RIA Novosti reported that Kikina had been assigned to the Soyuz MS-22 mission, set to launch on 21 September 2022, for a 188-day mission.

SpaceX Crew-5 
In December 2021, Roscosmos Director General Dmitry Rogozin announced she would fly on an "American commercial spacecraft" in September 2022, while a NASA astronaut would take her seat on Soyuz making her the first Russian cosmonaut to fly a Crew Dragon and the first Roscosmos cosmonaut to fly aboard a U.S. spacecraft since 2002. In October 2022, the commercial flight launched as the SpaceX Crew-5 Crew Dragon.

On 11 March 2023 the SpaceX Crew-5 returned to earth after 157 days. The flight lasted about 19 hours, and their capsule landed in the Gulf of Mexico.

Education 
Kikina graduated with honors from the Novosibirsk State Academy of Water Transportation Engineering. She also earned her degree in economics and management.

Personal life 
Kikina was born in Novosibirsk. She worked as a tour guide in Altai Region, as well as a swimming and paratrooper instructor. She also worked as Radio Host for Radio Siberia.

In spring 2021, toy manufacturer Mattel released a Barbie astronaut doll in Kikina’s image.

Kikina is married to Alexander Serdyuk, a physical training instructor at the Cosmonaut Training Center.

References 

1984 births
Living people
Russian cosmonauts
Women astronauts
People from Novosibirsk
Siberian State University of Water Transport alumni
21st-century Russian women